Events from the year 1893 in France.

Incumbents
President: Marie François Sadi Carnot 
President of the Council of Ministers: 
 until 4 April: Alexandre Ribot 
 4 April-3 December: Charles Dupuy
 starting 3 December: Jean Casimir-Perier

Events
 10 March – Côte d'Ivoire becomes a French colony.
 16–17 August – Massacre of Italian workers of the Compagnie des Salins du Midi in Aigues-Mortes (France) by French villagers and workers. Anti-French riots erupt in Italy. In Rome the windows of the French Embassy were smashed and for a while the angry mob seemed to get out of hand.
 20 August – Legislative election held.
 3 September – Legislative election held.
 10 October – First car number plates in Paris.

Births

January to June
 3 February – Gaston Julia, mathematician (died 1978).
 5 February – Arsène Roux, Arabist and Berberologist (died 1971).
 15 March – Jules Moch, politician (died 1985).
 21 March – Marcel Rey-Golliet, boxer (died 1967).
 3 April – Bernard Faÿ, historian (died 1978).
 17 April – Marguerite Broquedis, tennis player (died 1983).
 12 May – René Mourlon, athlete and Olympic medallist (died 1977).
 14 May – Louis Verneuil, playwright and screenwriter (died 1952).

July to December
 28 July – Alfred Eluère, rugby union player (died 1985).
 15 August – Eugène Criqui, world champion boxer (died 1977).
 15 August – Pierre Dac, humorist and French Resistance activist (died 1975).
 17 August – Jean Laigret, biologist (died 1966).
 19 October – Henri Mignet, aircraft designer and builder (died 1965).
 1 November – Pierre Deley, pioneering pilot (died 1981).
 5 November – Raymond Loewy, industrial designer (died 1986).
 3 December – Edmond Decottignies, weightlifter and Olympic gold medallist (died 1963).
 8 December – Pierre Etchebaster, real tennis player (died 1980).
 31 December – Robert Jacquinot, cyclist (died 1980).

Deaths
 10 January – Alexis André, missionary priest in Canada (born 1832).
 27 March – Alphonse Beau de Rochas, engineer (born 1815).
 4 April – Alphonse Pyrame de Candolle, botanist (born 1806).
 8 April – Félix Esquirou de Parieu, statesman (born 1815).
 12 April – Alfred-Henri-Amand Mame, printer and publisher (born 1811).
 28 April – Gustave Nadaud, songwriter and chansonnier (born 1820).
 16 August – Jean-Martin Charcot, neurologist and professor of anatomical pathology (born 1825).
 17 October – Patrice de Mac-Mahon, duc de Magenta, general and politician, first President of the Third Republic (born 1808).
 18 October – Charles Gounod, composer (born 1818).
 4 November – Pierre Tirard, politician (born 1827).
 8 November – Arnaud-Michel d'Abbadie, geographer (born 1815).
 17 November – Hippolyte Destailleur, architect (born 1822).

Full date unknown
 Jacques-Marie-Frangile Bigot, naturalist and entomologist (born 1818).
 Augustine Brohan, actress (born 1824).
 Nicolas Édouard Delabarre-Duparcq, military critic and historian (born 1819).
 Auguste-Barthélemy Glaize, painter (born 1807).

References

1890s in France